The Op. 63 mazurkas by Frédéric Chopin are a set of three mazurkas written in 1846 and published in 1847. These were the last set of mazurkas published during Chopin's lifetime and demonstrate Chopin's late style. A typical performance of all three mazurkas lasts around six minutes.

 No. 1 in B major
 No. 2 in F minor
 No. 3 in C-sharp minor

References

External links 

Mazurkas by Frédéric Chopin
1846 compositions
Music with dedications

Compositions in B major
Compositions in F minor
Compositions in C-sharp minor